Association football in America could mean:

United States

 Soccer in the United States
 United States Soccer Federation
 Major League Soccer

The Americas

 Association football
 CONCACAF (North America)
 CONCACAF Gold Cup
 CONCACAF Champions League
 CONMEBOL (South America)
 Copa América
 Copa Libertadores
 Soccer in Canada
 Canadian Soccer Association
Canadian Soccer League

See also
Football in America (disambiguation)
Sports in the United States
Sport in South America